Idelfonso da Silva is an East Timorese  football player. He is the current defender for the Timor-Leste national football team.

International career
Idelfonso da Silva have not been called to play in the starting line-up. But he played as substitute during the first leg of  2014 FIFA World Cup qualification – AFC First Round.

References

Living people
East Timorese footballers
Association football defenders
Timor-Leste international footballers
Year of birth missing (living people)